Liam Cunningham (25 January 1915 – 29 February 1976) was an Irish Fianna Fáil politician. He was born in County Donegal in 1915. A qualified national school teacher, Cunningham was first elected to Dáil Éireann as a Fianna Fáil Teachta Dála (TD) for the Donegal East constituency at the 1951 general election. At the time the senior Fianna Fáil TD was Neil Blaney who would subsequently become a Government Minister. From 1961 onwards, he was elected for the Donegal North-East constituency.

After the events of the Arms Crisis Blaney was sacked as Minister for Agriculture by the Taoiseach Jack Lynch. In the resulting reshuffle Cunningham was appointed Parliamentary Secretary to the Minister for Local Government on 9 May 1970. This was something of a surprise at the time and was attributed to an attempt by the party leadership to pressurise Blaney within the Donegal North-East constituency. Cunningham remained a Parliamentary Secretary until Fianna Fáil lost power at the 1973 general election.

When Blaney launched the Independent Fianna Fáil organisation, most of the Fianna Fáil public representatives in the area joined the new organisation. Cunningham remained loyal, however, and was comfortably re-elected at the 1973 general election. He remained a TD until his death on 29 February 1976. In a considerable political shock the resulting by-election was won by Paddy Keaveney of Independent Fianna Fáil.

Sources

References

 

1915 births
1976 deaths
Fianna Fáil TDs
Members of the 14th Dáil
Members of the 15th Dáil
Members of the 16th Dáil
Members of the 17th Dáil
Members of the 18th Dáil
Members of the 19th Dáil
Members of the 20th Dáil
Irish schoolteachers
Politicians from County Donegal
Parliamentary Secretaries of the 19th Dáil